Tim Porter (born May 1974) is a British film editor, best known for his work on the HBO series, Game of Thrones, as well as several other notable British television series. He worked as an editor and co-producer on the Game of Thrones prequel, House of the Dragon.

Career 
In 2019, he won his second Emmy award (Outstanding Single-Camera Picture Editing for A Drama Series) for Game of Thrones  "The Long Night", (season 8, episode 3). The episode was directed by Miguel Sapochnik. Porter describes it as "a constant search for the correct rhythm."  He was awarded the American Cinema Editors 2020 Eddie for that same episode.

He won the 2016 Emmy for "Battle of the Bastards", again directed by Sapochnik. He 'sifted through nearly 100 hours of footage to create a seamless battle scene.' He was also given both the 2016 HPA and Eddie awards.

He was recognised in Variety 2016 'Below The Line Impact Report' as, 'an editor capable of building suspense and excruciating drama.

He has received four Emmy and four Eddie nominations for his editing of Game of Thrones.

He is a member of American Cinema Editors.

References

External links 

1974 births
Living people
English television editors
British film editors